Nouvion is a commune of the Somme department in France.

Nouvion is also part of the name of several communes in France:
 Nouvion-et-Catillon, in the Aisne department
 Nouvion-le-Comte, in the Aisne department
 Nouvion-le-Vineux, in the Aisne department
 Nouvion-sur-Meuse, in the Ardennes department
 Le Nouvion-en-Thiérache, in the Aisne department

Nouvion is a French family:
 André-Pierre Nouvion, French lawyer and historian of French law
 Laurent Nouvion, Monegasque politician and attorney